Tenev is a surname. Notable people with the surname include:

Georgi Tenev (born 1969), Bulgarian writer
Plamen Tenev (born 1995), Bulgarian footballer
Tencho Tenev (born 1955), Bulgarian football manager
Vladimir Tenev (born 1986/1987), American billionaire, co-founder of Robinhood

Bulgarian-language surnames